Nervino Airport  is a public airport located one mile (1.6 km) east of Beckwourth, serving Plumas County, California, United States. The airport is mostly used for general aviation. It is used for the area's annual fly-in breakfast.

Facilities 

 Runway 8/26: 4,651 x 75 ft (1,418 x 23 m), surface: asphalt

References

External links 

Airports in Plumas County, California